The Ferriman–Gallwey score is a method of evaluating and quantifying hirsutism in women.  The method was originally published in 1961 by D. Ferriman and J.D. Gallwey in the Journal of Clinical Endocrinology.

The original method used 11 body areas to assess hair growth, but was decreased to 9 body areas in the modified method:

Upper lip
Chin
Chest
Upper back
Lower back
Upper abdomen
Lower abdomen
Upper arms
Forearms (deleted in the modified method)
Thighs
Legs (deleted in the modified method)

In the modified method, hair growth is rated from 0 (no growth of terminal hair) to 4 (extensive hair growth) in each of the nine locations.  A patient's score may therefore range from a minimum score of 0 to a maximum score of 36. With each ethnic group, the amount of hair expected for that ethnicity should be considered. For example, in Caucasian women, a score of 8 or higher is regarded as indicative of androgen excess. 

The method was further modified in 2001 to include a total of 19 locations, with the 10 extra locations being: sideburns, neck, buttocks, inguinal area, perianal area, forearm, leg, foot, toes and fingers.  Each area has its own specified definition of the four-point scale.

References

External links
 

 

Dermatologic terminology